A South Side or Southside is an alcoholic beverage made with gin, lime juice, simple syrup and mint. A variant, the Southside Fizz, adds soda water.

History
Its origins are subject to speculation. It has been proposed that it gets its name from either the South Side district of the city of Chicago, Illinois, or from the Southside Sportsmen's Club on Long Island.

The drink may have been the preferred beverage of Al Capone, whose gang dominated Chicago's South Side. The gin imported by Capone's rivals on the North Side of Chicago was smooth, and usually consumed with ginger ale. However, the gin consumed by Al Capone's gang had a rougher finish, and required more sweeteners to make it palatable. Thus the South Side was born.

21 Club recipe
The following list of ingredients for a south side is used by the famed 21 Club in New York City.

  Tanqueray gin
  mint simple syrup
 4–5 fresh mint leaves
 juice of one lemon
 splash of soda

South Side Fizz

A South Side Fizz adds soda water:
  gin
  lime juice
  simple syrup
 1 sprig mint (and one for garnish)
 club soda

In a shaker, muddle the mint, lime juice and simple syrup. Add the gin and fill with ice. Shake, and strain into a highball glass filled with crushed ice. Stir until frost appears on the outside of the glass. Fill with club soda and garnish with another mint sprig.

Related drinks
The Tom Collins does not include mint, and is carbonated.

References 

Cocktails with gin
Cocktails with limeade
Cocktails with eggs
Cocktails with lemon juice